People For the American Way Foundation is the charitable arm of People For the American Way (PFAW), a progressive advocacy organization in the United States.  Unlike its parent organization, the Foundation is restricted to activities that are permitted to organizations registered under section 501(c)(3) of the Internal Revenue Code; thus, donors to it may claim a tax deduction for the amount of their donation.

PFAW is prominent within the left-wing progressive political movement for monitoring right-wing activities, conducting rapid response, political lobbying, and volunteer mobilization. The PFAW Foundation runs programs designed for voter education and progressive infrastructure building.  PFAW Foundation programs include Mi Familia Vota, which conducts Hispanic civic engagement, and several African-American outreach programs such as the African-American Ministers Leadership Council.

In 2005, PFAW Foundation initiated a fellowship program, called Young People For, to identify, train, and support future progressive leaders. In 2006, Young People For spun off the Young Elected Officials Network, which was created to identify and support progressive elected officials from around the country who are under the age of 35.

Another new  endeavor is the Center for American Values in Public Life, a think tank tasked with studying and clarifying the intersection of religion, morality, and progressive politics.

External links
 The Foundation's page in the PFAW website

People for the American Way
Political advocacy groups in the United States
Progressive organizations in the United States
501(c)(3) organizations